The place of First water-to-water flight was designated a California Historic Landmark (No.775) on September 25, 1962. On May 10, 1912, 26 year old Glenn L. Martin (January 17, 1886 – December 5, 1955) flew a self-built seaplane from Balboa Bay at Newport Bay, California to Avalon  Harbor on Catalina Island, then back across the channel. His amphibian biplane, the Avalon Zipper, broke the earlier English Channel record for over-water flight. Avalon Zipper had a 15-horsepower Model V Ford gasoline engine donated by Henry Ford. He picked up a bag of mail on the island on the way, and was presented with $100 ($ in 2011) prize for his achievement. The trip made headline news around the world. Soon regular seaplane passenger and freight services started between Catalina and the ports of Balboa, Long Beach, Wilmington and San Diego, like: Catalina Air Lines. Jim Watson, an aviation historian made a television documentary Wings Across the Channel, the Golden Age of Seaplanes on Catalina., starting with Glenn L. Martin trip.

Markers
Marker at the site reads: 
On May 10, 1912, Glenn L. Martin flew his own plane, built in Santa Ana, from the waters of the Pacific Ocean at Balboa to Catalina Island. This was the first water-to-water flight, and the longest and fastest overwater flight, to that date. On his return to the mainland, Martin carried the day's mail from Catalina-another first.

See also
California Historical Landmarks in Orange County, California
 Amphibious aircraft
 Floatplane
 Flying boat
 List of seaplanes and amphibious aircraft
 List of seaplane operators

References

1912 in California
California Historical Landmarks
Aviation records